Giovanni Thomas Marnavich or Joannes Thomas Marnavich or Ivan Tomko Mrnavić (born 1579; died 1635 or 1637 or 1639) was a Roman Catholic prelate who served as Bishop of Bosnia (1631–1639) and an author of historical works. He was the author of several forgeries, with the most famous being that of the Life of Justinian. He also wrote a book on the Life of Saint Sava.

Biography
On 10 November 1631, Giovanni Thomas Marnavich was appointed during the papacy of Pope Urban VIII as Bishop of Bosnia. On 23 November 1631, he was consecrated bishop by Luigi Caetani, Cardinal-Priest of Santa Pudenziana, with Erasmo Paravicini, Bishop of Alessandria, and Bartol Kačić, Bishop of Makarska, serving as co-consecrators.  He served as Bishop of Bosnia until his death in 1635 or 1639.

In 1631, Marnavich published a pamphlet that Albanian national hero Scanderbeg was not an Albanian but rather a Serb. His claim was refuted by Frang Bardhi in his The Apology of Scanderbeg, published in Venice in 1636.

Views 
Mrnavić believed that the Illyrians were Slavs.
He claimed that Skanderbeg, the national hero of Albania, was of Slav origin, which prompted Frang Bardhi to write a biography on Skanderbeg published in Venice in 1636 as a polemic against him, defending the Albanian identity of Skanderbeg.

Episcopal succession
While bishop, Marnavich was the principal co-consecrator of:
Octavio Asinari, Bishop of Ivrea (1634); and
Nicolaus de Georgiis (Zorzi), Bishop of Hvar (1635).

Works 
His works written in Latin include:
 Vita beati Augustini (Augustin Kažotić)
 Vita Berislavi (Petar Berislavić) 1620
 Vita s. Sabbae (Saint Sava), Rome, 1630–31

His works written in "Illyrian" language include:
 Život Margarite blažene divice, kćeri Bele, kralja ugarskoga i hrvatskoga, 1613, translated from Italian
 Žalosnoskazje Krispa Cezara, 1614 - translated from Latin, tragedy of Bernarda Stefoni
 Život Magdalene od knezov Žirova, Rome 1626, Biblical-religious epic, translated to Italian, celebrating union of asceticism and anti-Turkish sentiment
 Potuženje pokornika, songs on death of Jesus, half of the poem is translated from song written on Latin by Sannazar 
 Osmanšćica, drama written in 1631

References

1579 births
1637 deaths
1639 deaths
17th-century Roman Catholic bishops in Hungary
Bishops appointed by Pope Urban VIII
17th-century Venetian historians
Bishops of Bosnia
Venetian period in the history of Croatia